La Brassiere is a 2001 Hong Kong romantic comedy film starring Lau Ching-wan, Louis Koo, Carina Lau and Gigi Leung. The film was followed by a sequel, titled Mighty Baby, which was released in 2002.

Plot
The film's underlying plot is to create the "ultimate brassiere" for a Japanese company specialising in this undergarment, hence the fanciful title. Samantha (Carina Lau), who is managing the Hong Kong subsidiary of the company, is the project leader of this assignment and she appoints two zany but highly creative designers to aid her in that project, Wayne (Louis Koo) and Johnny (Lau Ching-wan). Johnny flirts with Samantha soon enough, being engaged in such a work, which he claims would assist in his creative powers although the story was more engaged in the humorous efforts in creating the bra. However, Samantha snubbed his overtures and their love affair remained in balance.

Meanwhile, during the project various prototypes were tried and tested, but with appalling results. Apparently, Wayne and Johnny being both male were unable to realise the finer points of creating the undergarment. Lena (Gigi Leung), a lover of Wayne and also working on the project then got the inspiration that the "ultimate bra" is the one which incorporates the feeling a woman has when her male lover lovingly supports her breasts. Accordingly, the two designers created just such an undergarment and was approved by their Japanese employers.

Cast
 Lau Ching-wan as Johnny 
 Louis Koo as Wayne 
 Carina Lau as Samantha 
 Gigi Leung as Lena 
 Lee San-san as Candy 
 Chikako Aoyama as Nanako 
 GC Goo-Bi as Gigi 
 Rosemary Vandenbroucke as Eileen, the "in-house model" 
 Kristal Tin as Ballroom manager
 Asuka Higuchi as Suki
 Maria Chan as Jolene
 John Chan as 1st designer job applicant
 Michael Wai as 2nd designer job applicant (photographer)
 Matt Chow as 3rd designer job applicant
 Wing Shya as 4th designer job applicant (director)
 Dante Lam as 5th designer job applicant (bartender)
 Chan Wan-wan as Sharon
 Lau Siu-mui as Siu-mui
 Ng Choi-yuk as Yoko
 Liz Li as ET
 Renee Wong as Renee
 Yeung Man-kei as Maggie
 Chung Kiu-chi as Gigi
 Wong Aou-bik as Julibee
 Lau Yee-san as Phyllisia
 Patrick Tam as Ali Bra Bra
 Caroline Caron as Model
 Scotea as Louis
 Vindy Chan as Louis's wife
 Karen Mok as Shirley
 Jo Kuk as Alex
 Stephen Fung as Fung 
 Ji-gang Mei-sui as Miko
 Steve Mullins as Hotel manager
 Sai Samone as Bra material analyst
 Tam Tin-po as Bra shop customer
 Michael Clements as Samantha's client
 Otto Chan as Young molester

Theme song
Intimate (貼心)
Composer: Chiu Tseng-hei
Lyricist: Keith Chan Siu-kei
Singer: Gigi Leung

References

External links

 HK cinemagic entry

2001 films
Hong Kong romantic comedy films
China Star Entertainment Group films
2001 romantic comedy films
2000s Cantonese-language films
Films set in Hong Kong
Films shot in Hong Kong
2000s Hong Kong films